The 2018–19 season is Swindon Town's 140th season in their existence, and second season back in League Two following relegation from League One. The season covers the period from 1 July 2018 through to 30 June 2019.

Players

First Team Squad

Transfers

Transfers in

Transfers out

Loans in

Loans out

Competitions

Friendlies
Swindon Town have announced they will face Cirencester Town, Melksham Town, West Bromwich Albion, Chippenham Town, Portsmouth and Swindon Supermarine as part of their pre-season preparations.

Overview

{| class="wikitable" style="text-align: center"
|-
!rowspan=2|Competition
!colspan=8|Record
|-
!
!
!
!
!
!
!
!
|-
| League Two

|-
| FA Cup

|-
| EFL Cup

|-
| EFL Trophy

|-
! Total

League Two

League table

Results summary

Results by matchday

Matches
On 21 June 2018, the League Two fixtures for the forthcoming season were announced.

FA Cup

The first round draw was made live on BBC by Dennis Wise and Dion Dublin on 22 October. The draw for the second round was made live on BBC and BT by Mark Schwarzer and Glenn Murray on 12 November.

EFL Cup

On 15 June 2018, the draw for the first round was made in Vietnam.

EFL Trophy

Group stage
On 13 July 2018, the initial group stage draw bar the U21 invited clubs was announced.

Statistics

Appearances

Top scorers
The list is sorted by shirt number when total goals are equal.

Clean sheets
The list is sorted by shirt number when total appearances are equal.

Summary

References

Swindon Town F.C. seasons
Swindon Town